The State Museum of Applied Arts of Uzbekistan is an art museum located in Tashkent, Uzbekistan, founded in 1937 as a temporary exhibition for handicrafts. The museum contains over 4,000 exhibits on decorative art in Uzbekistan, including wood carving, ceramics, embossing, jewelry, gold weaving, embroidery, and samples of mass production in local industry.

History
Until the beginning of the 21st century, the museum was located in the former palace of the Russian diplomat Alexander Alexandrovich Polovtsev Jr.

The museum building, known as the Polovtsev house, was purchased by his secretary Mikhail Stepanovich Andreev from Tashkent merchant Nikolai Ivanovich Ivanov. Under Andreev's guidance, the interiors of the house were readjusted and refurbished to fit an Oriental style. The main architect of this restructuring was A. A. Burmeyster. The house was known colloquially as the "Polovtsev House". The building is an example of Oriental architectural and decorative art, built in the late 19th century. The decoration, carving and painting of the building was done by Uzbek folk artists Usta T. Arsankulov, A. Kazymdzhanov (Tashkent), Usta Shirin Muradov (Bukhara), Usta A. Palvanov (Khiva), and Usta Abdullah (Rishtan).

During the First World War, the house was used to hold captured Austrian officers. After the Russian Revolution until the mid-30s, the building housed an orphanage. Subsequently, various organizations operated out of the house, including a training center for ganch carving and embossing, as well as an embroidery workshop. Since July 1937, the house housed the Handicraft Museum, the Museum of Applied Art's predecessor.

In 1941 and 1961, the building was restored. In 1960, it received the name "Permanent Exhibition of Applied Arts of Uzbekistan". In 1970, the museum building was reconstructed. In 1997, the museum was transferred to the Ministry of Culture of the Republic of Uzbekistan, receiving the status of "State Museum of Applied Art".

References

External links
 website
 On the history of the "House of Polovtsev" in Tashkent
 State Museum of Applied Arts of Uzbekistan

1937 establishments in Uzbekistan
Art museums established in 1937
Museums in Tashkent
Art museums and galleries in Uzbekistan
Decorative arts museums